Norway–Vulcan Area Schools is a school district serving Norway and Waucedah townships in Dickinson County and Faithorn in Menominee County all located in the Upper Peninsula of Michigan.

The school district was formed in 1964 following the consolidation of Norway City Schools, Norway Township, Waucedah Township and Faithorn. The Norway–Vulcan Area Schools serves more than 800 students on its  campus in the city of Norway. The facility, opened in 1991 and expanded in 2001, comprises three wings each housing a different school (elementary, middle, and high school). At the core of the building is three gymnasiums, the media center and the 684-seat Norway Fine Arts Center.

Schools
Norway High School has been accredited by the North Central Association of Schools since 1907. In recent years, the high school was identified by U.S. News & World Report as one of America's best high schools, earning a bronze medal. The sports teams, The Knights, compete in the Mid-Peninsula Conference. The school serves nearly 300 students in grades 9 through 12.

Vulcan Middle School is located on the campus in Norway. It was named for the neighboring community of Vulcan following consolidation of the school district in 1964. It moved to its current location with construction of the facility in 1991. The school serves nearly 300 students in grades 5 through 8.

Norway Elementary School serves nearly 300 students in grades pre-kindergarten through 4.

References

Education in Dickinson County, Michigan
School districts established in 1964
Education in Menominee County, Michigan
School districts in Michigan
1964 establishments in Michigan